Modoleşti may refer to several villages in Romania:

 Modoleşti, a village in Întregalde Commune, Alba County
 Modoleşti, a village in Vidra Commune, Alba County